Afonso V (15 January 1432 – 28 August 1481), known by the sobriquet the African, was king of Portugal from 1438 until his death in 1481, with a brief interruption in 1477. His sobriquet refers to his military conquests in Northern Africa.

As of 1471, Afonso V was the first king of Portugal to claim dominion over a plural "Kingdom of the Algarves", instead of the singular "Kingdom of the Algarve". Territories added to the Portuguese crown lands in North Africa during the 15th century came to be referred to as possessions of the Kingdom of the Algarve (now a region of southern Portugal), not the Kingdom of Portugal. The "Algarves" then were considered to be the southern Portuguese territories on both sides of the Strait of Gibraltar.

Early life

Afonso was born in Sintra, the second son of King Edward of Portugal by his wife Eleanor of Aragon. Following the death of his older brother, Infante João (1429–1433), Afonso acceded to the position of heir apparent and was made the first Prince of Portugal by his father, who sought to emulate the English Court's custom of a dynastic title that distinguished the heir apparent from the other children of the monarch. He was only six years old when he succeeded his father in 1438.

During his minority, Afonso was placed under the regency of his mother, Eleanor, in accordance with the will left by his late father. As both a foreigner and a woman, the queen was not a popular choice for regent. When the cortes met in late 1438, a law was passed requiring a joint regency consisting of Eleanor and Pedro, Duke of Coimbra, the younger brother of the late king. The dual regency was a failure and in 1439, the cortes named Pedro "protector and guardian" of the king and "ruler and defender" of the kingdom. Eleanor attempted to resist, but without support in Portugal she fled to Castile.

Pedro's main policies were concerned with restricting the political power of the great noble houses and expanding the powers of the crown. The country prospered under his rule, but not peacefully, as his laws interfered with the ambition of powerful nobles. The count of Barcelos, a personal enemy of the Duke of Coimbra (despite being half-brothers) eventually became the king's favourite uncle and began a constant struggle for power. In 1442, the king made the count his uncle Afonso the first Duke of Braganza. With this title and its lands, he became the most powerful man in Portugal and one of the richest men in Europe. To secure his position as regent, Pedro had Afonso marry his daughter, Isabella of Coimbra, in 1445.

But on 9 June 1448, when the king came of age, Pedro had to surrender his power to Afonso V.  The years of conspiracy by the Duke of Braganza finally came to a head. On 15 September of the same year, Afonso V nullified all the laws and edicts approved under the regency. In the following year, led by what were later discovered to be false accusations, Afonso declared Pedro a rebel and defeated his army in the Battle of Alfarrobeira, in which his uncle (and father-in-law) was killed.

Invasion of Morocco

Afonso V then turned his attentions to North Africa. In the reign of his grandfather John I, Ceuta had been conquered and taken over from the king of Morocco, and now the new king wanted to expand the conquests. The king's army conquered Alcácer Ceguer in 1458 and Arzila in 1471. Tangiers, on the other hand, was won and lost several times between 1460 and 1464. These achievements granted the king the nickname of the African or Africano. The king also supported the exploration of the Atlantic Ocean led by prince Henry the Navigator but after Henry's death in 1460, he did nothing to continue Henry's work. Administratively, Afonso V was a passive king. He chose not to pursue the revision of laws or development of commerce, preferring instead to preserve the legacy of his father Edward and grandfather John I.  In 1469, King Afonso V of Portugal granted Fernão Gomes the monopoly of trade in the Gulf of Guinea.

In 1452, Pope Nicholas V issued the papal bull Dum Diversas, which granted Afonso V the right to reduce "Saracens, pagans and any other unbelievers" to hereditary slavery. This was reaffirmed and extended in the Romanus Pontifex bull of 1455 (also by Nicholas V). These papal bulls came to be seen by some as a justification for the subsequent era of slave trade and European colonialism.

Castile
When the campaigns in Africa were over, Afonso V found new grounds for battle in neighboring Castile. On December 11, 1474, King Henry IV of Castile died without a male heir, leaving just one daughter, Joanna. However, her paternity was questioned; it was rumored that his wife, Queen Joan of Portugal (Afonso's sister) had an affair with a nobleman named Beltrán de La Cueva. The death of Henry ignited a war of succession with one faction supporting Joanna and the other supporting Isabella, Henry's half-sister. Afonso V was persuaded to intervene on behalf of Joanna, his niece. He betrothed himself to her, proclaimed himself king of Castile and led troops into the kingdom. Because of their close blood-relationship, a formal marriage had to wait for papal dispensation.

On May 12, 1475, Afonso entered Castile with an army of 5,600 cavalry and 14,000 foot soldiers. In March 1476, after several skirmishes and much maneuvering, the 8, 000 men of Afonso and Prince João, faced a Castilian force of similar size in the battle of Toro. The Castilians were led by Isabella's husband, Prince Ferdinand II of Aragon, Cardinal Mendoza and the Duke of Alba. The fight was fierce and confusing but the result was a stalemate: While the forces of Cardinal Mendoza and the Duke of Alba won over their opponents led by the Portuguese King –who left the battlefield to take refuge in Castronuño, the troops commanded by Prince Joao defeated and persecuted the troops of the Castilian right wing, recovered the Portuguese royal standard, remaining ordered in the battlefield where they collected the fugitives of Afonso.  Both sides claimed victory but Afonso's prospects for obtaining the Castilian crown were severely damaged.

After the battle, Afonso sailed to France hoping to obtain the assistance of King Louis XI in his fight against Castile.  But finding himself deceived by the French monarch, he returned to Portugal in 1477. Disillusioned, he abdicated for a few days in November 1477 in favor of his son John II, then after returning to the throne, he retired to a monastery in Sintra, where he died in 1481.

Marriages and descendants

Afonso married firstly, in 1447, Isabella of Coimbra, with whom he had three children:

John, Prince of Portugal (29 January 1451).
Joan, Princess of Portugal (6 February 1452 – 12 May 1490): Known as Saint Joan of Portugal or Saint Joan Princess. 
John II of Portugal (3 March 1455 – 25 October 1495): Succeeded his father as 13th King of Portugal.

Afonso married secondly, in 1475, his niece Joanna of Castile, known as "La Beltraneja".

Ancestry

Notes

Bibliography 
English
Downey, Kirstin:  Isabella: the Warrior Queen, Anchor Books, New York, 2014

 Miller, Townsend:  The battle of Toro, 1476, in History Today, volume 14, 1964.

Non-English
 
 Saul, António:  Dom Afonso V, vol. 12 of Reis de Portugal, 2009, Temas e Debates-Actividades Editoriais, 

1432 births
1481 deaths
15th-century Portuguese monarchs
House of Aviz
Knights of the Garter
People from Sintra
Portuguese exploration in the Age of Discovery
Portuguese infantes
Portuguese people of English descent
Princes of Portugal
Sons of kings